The Perks Baronetcy, of Wykham Park in the Parish of Neithrop in the County of Oxford, was a title in the Baronetage of the United Kingdom. It was created on 24 July 1908 for the Liberal politician Robert Perks. The title became extinct on the death of his son, the second Baronet, in 1979.

Perks baronets, of Wykham Park (1908)
Sir Robert William Perks, 1st Baronet (1849–1934)
Sir Robert Malcolm Mewburn Perks, 2nd Baronet (1892–1979)

References

Extinct baronetcies in the Baronetage of the United Kingdom